Nguyễn Thị Mỹ Đức is a former wushu taolu athlete from Vietnam. She was a triple medalist at the World Wushu Championships, triple medalist at the Asian Wushu Championships (including being the Asian Champion in changquan), and an eight-time medalist at the Southeast Asian Games. She also won the bronze medal in women's changquan at the 2002 Asian Games. She retired in 2007 and became a coach.

She is the sister of fellow wushu athlete Nguyễn Thị Ngọc Oanh.

Competitive history

Awards 

 Labor Order, 3rd class (2004)

See also 

 List of Asian Games medalists in wushu

References 

1984 births
Living people
Vietnamese wushu practitioners
Wushu practitioners at the 2002 Asian Games
Medalists at the 2002 Asian Games
Asian Games medalists in wushu
Asian Games bronze medalists for Vietnam
Southeast Asian Games gold medalists for Vietnam
Southeast Asian Games silver medalists for Vietnam
Southeast Asian Games bronze medalists for Vietnam